Dženan Zaimović (born September 25, 1973) is a Bosnian professional football manager and former player who is the manager of First League of FBiH club TOŠK Tešanj.

Playing career

International
He made his debut for Bosnia and Herzegovina in a March 2000 friendly match away against Jordan and has earned a total of 2 caps, scoring no goals. His second and final international was also against Jordan, 4 days later.

Honours

Player
Velež Mostar
First League of FBiH: 2005–06

References

External links

1973 births
Living people
Sportspeople from Mostar
Association football central defenders
Bosnia and Herzegovina footballers
Bosnia and Herzegovina international footballers
FK Velež Mostar players
Fortuna Düsseldorf players
Regionalliga players
Premier League of Bosnia and Herzegovina players
First League of the Federation of Bosnia and Herzegovina players
Bosnia and Herzegovina expatriate footballers
Expatriate footballers in Germany
Bosnia and Herzegovina expatriate sportspeople in Germany
Bosnia and Herzegovina football managers
FK Velež Mostar managers
NK TOŠK Tešanj managers
Premier League of Bosnia and Herzegovina managers